The Russian National Freestyle Wrestling Championships 2020 (also known as the Russian Nationals 2020) was held in Naro-Fominsk, Moscow Oblast by the Russian Wrestling Federation at the Naro-Fominsk ice place arena between 16 October to 18 October 2020.

Medal table

Men's freestyle

See also 

2019 Russian National Freestyle Wrestling Championships
2018 Russian National Freestyle Wrestling Championships
2017 Russian National Freestyle Wrestling Championships
2016 Russian National Freestyle Wrestling Championships
Soviet and Russian results in men's freestyle wrestling

References 

Russian National Freestyle Wrestling Championships
Sport in Sochi
2020 in sport wrestling
2020 in Russian sport
Wrestling